New Brunswick's Equal Opportunity Program was a government program that transformed social services in the Canadian province of New Brunswick. It was begun in 1967 under the leadership of premier Louis Robichaud.

The program was one of a series of progressive reforms brought by Robichaud's Liberal Party government.

By the early 1960s New Brunswick had become a province with deep regional inequalities. While municipalities and counties were responsible for providing a wide range of services to their populations, they did not have an adequate tax base to pay for them. These services included health, welfare, education, and justice. In 1962 the Royal Commission on Finance and Municipal Taxation was formed. The resulting findings and recommendations went on to inform the Equal Opportunity Program. The most significant changes to the local governance system included:

 Realignment of service responsibilities between the provincial and local governments. Services such as education, health, social welfare and the administration of justice became the complete responsibility of the provincial government. Local services such as fire protection, roads and streets, police protection, parks and recreation, local planning and development would be looked after by local governments.
 Introduction of a revamped property tax system to support the new provincial and local service responsibilities and the new structure. This included the introduction of the provincial property tax ($1.50 per $100 of assessment); the centralization of the assessment, billing and collection functions.
 Abolition and replacement of county municipalities with Local Service Districts. Many small communities were incorporated as villages and existing towns and cities remained in place. The abolition left the counties with no with no political role, although the old county and parish borders were still used to define the local service districts that replaced county councils, and for the census subdivisions of Census Canada.
 Introduction of an unconditional grant system for local governments and Local Service Districts to help ensure that residents could receive a comparable level of services at reasonable property tax rates. 
 Enactment of The Municipalities Act to set the administrative and governance framework for municipalities and Local Service Districts. 

Parts of the report were implemented as the Equal Opportunity Program on 1 January 1967. The province took responsibility for health, welfare, education, and justice. The poll tax was abolished, the number of school districts was reduced to 34 from over 400, and property tax was imposed.

More than 50 years after being implemented, these changes still form the basis of our local governance system. However, many adjustments to the local governance system, large and small, have been made during this time in response to the various issues that have arisen.

References

Defunct New Brunswick government departments and agencies